The 2007 Acura Sports Car Challenge of St. Petersburg was the second round of the 2007 American Le Mans Series season.  It took place on March 31, 2007.

Official results
Class winners in bold.  Cars failing to complete 70% of winner's distance marked as Not Classified (NC).

Statistics
 Pole Position - #7 Penske Racing - 1:03.089
 Fastest Lap - #6 Penske Racing - 1:04.340

External links
  

St. Petersburg
Grand Prix of St. Petersburg
2007 in sports in Florida
21st century in St. Petersburg, Florida